Juan Pablo Brzezicki and Mariano Hood were the defending champions; however, they didn't start this year.
British pair Jamie Delgado and Jamie Murray won this tournament, after their won against Stéphane Robert and Simone Vagnozzi 6–3, 6–3 in the final match.

Seeds

Draw

Draw

References
 Doubles Draw

BMW Ljubljana Open - Doubles
BMW Ljubljana Open